"Almost Always" is a song recorded by Canadian country music artist Chris Cummings. It was released in 1997 as the fourth single from his 1996 debut album, Somewhere Inside. It peaked at number 3 on the RPM Country Tracks chart in July 1997.

Chart performance

Year-end charts

References

1996 songs
1997 singles
Chris Cummings songs
Song recordings produced by Jim Ed Norman
Songs written by Chris Cummings
Warner Music Group singles